Víðir Reynisson (born 22 April 1967) is an Icelandic police officer and the chief superintendent of the Office of the National Commissioner of the Police. He is also the chief of security for the Football Association of Iceland.

Early life
Víðir was born in Vestmannaeyjar and lived there to the age of 11.

Career

COVID-19 pandemic in Iceland
Since February 2020, Víðir has been one of the lead members of the Iceland's Department of Civil Protection and Emergency Management addressing the COVID-19 pandemic in Iceland along with Alma Möller and Þórólfur Guðnason. 

On 25 November 2020 he was diagnosed with COVID-19 and on 4 December he was admitted into the National University Hospital of Iceland after his condition worsened. By 21 December, he had returned to duty.

See also
COVID-19 vaccination in Iceland

References

1967 births
Living people
Icelandic law enforcement officials
People from Vestmannaeyjar